The Bank of Calcutta (a precursor to the present State Bank of India) was founded on 2 June 1806, mainly to fund General Wellesley's wars against Tipu Sultan and the Marathas. It was the tenth oldest bank in India and was renamed Bank of Bengal on 2 January 1809.

History

The bank opened branches at Rangoon (1861), Patna (1862), Mirzapur (1862), and Benares (1862). When it became known that the bank intended to open a branch at Dacca, negotiations began that resulted in Bank of Bengal in 1862 amalgamating The Dacca Bank (1846). A branch at Cawnpore followed.

Famous Customers 
Among the bank's renowned customers were scholar and politician Dadabhai Naoroji, scientist Jagadish Chandra Bose, India's first President Rajendra Prasad, Nobel laureate Rabindranath Tagore, and educationalist Ishwar Chandra Vidyasagar.

Work 
The bank was risk averse and would not lend for more than three months, leading to local businessmen, both British and Indian launching private banks, many of which failed. The most storied bank failure was The Union Bank (1828) founded by Dwarakanath Tagore in partnership with British companies.

The Bank of Calcutta, and the two other Presidency banks — the Bank of Bombay and the Bank of Madras — amalgamated on 27 January 1921. The reorganized banking entity assumed the name Imperial Bank of India. The Reserve Bank of India, which is the central banking organization of India, in the year 1955, acquired a controlling interest in the Imperial Bank of India and the Imperial Bank of India was renamed on 30 April 1955 as the State Bank of India.

See also
 Banking in India
 History of banking

Citations and references
Citations

References

Further reading

1806 establishments in British India
1861 establishments in Burma
1861 establishments in the British Empire
19th century in Kolkata
Banks established in 1806
Banks disestablished in 1921
Banks based in Kolkata
Calcutta
Bengal Presidency
Indian companies established in 1806